At the 1936 Winter Olympics, four speed skating events were contested. The competitions were held on Tuesday, 11 February 1936, Wednesday, 12 February 1936, Thursday, 13 February 1936, and on Friday, 14 February 1936.

Medal summary
Medal winner shown below

Participating nations
Seventeen speed skaters competed in all four events.

A total of 52 speed skaters from 16 nations competed at the Garmisch-Partenkirchen Games:

Medal table

References

External links
International Olympic Committee results database
 

"Australians at the Olympics: A definitive history" by Gary Lester  (suspected errata listed in Errata/0949853054)
"2002 Australian Winter Olympic Team Guide" PDF file
"The Compendium: Official Australian Olympic Statistics 1896-2002" Australian Olympic Committee  (Inconsistencies in sources mentioned in Wikibooks:Errata/0702234257)

 
1936 Winter Olympics events
1936
Olympics, 1936